Quello Cunca (possibly from Quechua q'illu yellow, kunka throat, gullet, "yellow throat" or "yellow gullet") is a mountain in the Vilcanota mountain range in the Andes of Peru, about  high. It is situated in the Cusco Region, Quispicanchi Province, Marcapata District. Quello Cunca lies southwest of the mountains Sullulluni, Llusca Ritti and Jori Pintay, southwest of the mountain Tocllayoc and north of the mountain Condor Puñuna.

References

Mountains of Peru
Mountains of Cusco Region